The 2019–20 St. Louis Blues season was the 53rd season for the National Hockey League franchise that was established on June 5, 1967. The Blues entered the season as the defending Stanley Cup champions for the first time in franchise history.

The season was suspended by the league officials on March 12, 2020, after several other professional and collegiate sports organizations followed suit as a result of the ongoing COVID-19 pandemic. On May 26, the NHL regular season was officially declared over, with the remaining games being cancelled. The Blues advanced to the playoffs and played to play in a round-robin tournament, to determine the team's seed for the playoffs. The Blues faced the Vancouver Canucks in the first round, but were defeated in six games.

Off-season
On June 24, 2019, head coach Craig Berube signed a three-year contract with the Blues. Berube had been the interim head coach since November 2018 and helped the Blues win the Stanley Cup in the previous season.

Standings

Divisional standings

Western Conference

Tiebreaking procedures
 Fewer number of games played (only used during regular season).
 Greater number of regulation wins (denoted by RW).
 Greater number of wins in regulation and overtime (excluding shootout wins; denoted by ROW).
 Greater number of total wins (including shootouts).
 Greater number of points earned in head-to-head play; if teams played an uneven number of head-to-head games, the result of the first game on the home ice of the team with the extra home game is discarded.
 Greater goal differential (difference between goals for and goals against).
 Greater number of goals scored (denoted by GF).

Schedule and results

Preseason
The preseason schedule was published on June 18, 2019.

Regular season
The regular season schedule was published on June 25, 2019.

Playoffs 

The Blues played in a round-robin tournament to determine their seed for the playoffs. St. Louis finished with a 0–2–1 record to secure the fourth seed for the playoffs.

The Blues faced the Vancouver Canucks in the first round, and were eliminated in six games.

Player statistics

Skaters

Goaltenders

†Denotes player spent time with another team before joining the Blues. Stats reflect time with the Blues only.
‡Denotes player was traded mid-season. Stats reflect time with the Blues only.
Bold/italics denotes franchise record.

Transactions
The Blues have been involved in the following transactions during the 2019–20 season.

Trades

Free agents

Waivers

Contract terminations

Retirement

Signings

Draft picks

Below are the St. Louis Blues' selections at the 2019 NHL Entry Draft, which was held on June 21 and 22, 2019, at Rogers Arena in Vancouver, British Columbia.

Notes:
 The Toronto Maple Leafs' seventh-round pick went to the St. Louis Blues as the result of a trade on June 22, 2019, that sent a seventh-round pick in 2020 to Toronto in exchange for this pick.

References

St. Louis Blues seasons
St. Louis Blues
Blues
Blues
National Hockey League All-Star Game hosts